Jessie Creek is a stream in geographic Strathcona Township of Temagami in Nipissing District of Northeastern Ontario, Canada. It is part of the Great Lakes Basin and is one of several streams that empty into Lake Temagami.

Course

The creek begins at an unnamed pond adjacent to the old Ferguson Highway and heads westward for  where it flows under Highway 11. It then flows an additional  to the northwest where it enters the northeastern end of Jessie Lake.

See also
List of rivers of Ontario

References

External links

Rivers of Temagami
Strathcona Township